Bruce Silverstein Gallery is a photographic art gallery in the Chelsea section of Manhattan, New York City. It was started in 2001 by Bruce Silverstein. The gallery is a member of the Association of International Photography Art Dealers.

Exhibitions

The gallery has shown work by artists including Constantin Brâncuși, Marie Cosindas F. Holland Day, Todd Hido, André Kertész, Nathan Lyons, Lisette Model, Barbara Morgan, Aaron Siskind,  Keith A. Smith, Rosalind Solomon, Frederick Sommer, Trine Søndergaard, Zoe Strauss, and Michael Wolf.

The gallery has participated in art fairs including Paris Photo, Art Basel Miami Beach and The Armory Show.

References

Contemporary art galleries in the United States
Silverstein, Bruce
Art museums and galleries in Manhattan
Art galleries established in 2001
2001 establishments in New York City
Chelsea, Manhattan